HCPS may refer to:

Harford County Public Schools
Harrisonburg City Public Schools
Hantavirus cardiopulmonary syndrome
Healthcare Professionals
Henrico County Public Schools
Hillsborough County Public Schools

See also 
 HCP (disambiguation)